Wilders is an unincorporated community in Dewey Township, LaPorte County, Indiana.

History
Wilders, or Wilder Station, was once located at the junction of two railroads. Wilders contained a post office from 1889 until 1933.

Geography

References

Unincorporated communities in LaPorte County, Indiana
Unincorporated communities in Indiana